Toshitada is a masculine Japanese given name.

Possible writings
Toshitada can be written using different combinations of kanji characters. Here are some examples:

敏忠, "agile, loyalty"
敏只, "agile, only"
敏惟, "agile, consider"
敏唯, "agile, only"
敏匡, "agile, reform"
俊忠, "talented, loyalty"
俊只, "talented, only"
俊惟, "talented, consider"
俊唯, "talented, only"
俊匡, "talented, reform"
利忠, "benefit, loyalty"
利只, "benefit, only"
利惟, "benefit, consider"
寿忠, "long life, loyalty"
寿只, "long life, only"
寿惟, "long life, consider"
年忠, "year, loyalty"
年只, "year, only"
年惟, "year, consider"

The name can also be written in hiragana としただ or katakana トシタダ.

Notable people with the name
Toshitada Doi (土井 利忠, 1811–1869), Japanese daimyo.
Toshitada Doi (土井 利忠, born 1943), Japanese electrical engineer.
Toshitada Yoshida (吉田 敏忠, born 1947), Japanese sport wrestler.

Japanese masculine given names